Harbour Group Industries is an American privately owned multinational private equity firm, headquartered in St. Louis, Missouri. 

The company is a conglomerate.  It primarily owns and seeks the acquisition of North American manufacturing companies involved in several diverse sectors, including auto accessories, plastic-processing equipment, music, and entertainment. 

Until 2007, founder and former CEO Sam Fox controlled Harbour Group, but he resigned his position to assume his role as the United States Ambassador to Belgium. As of 2018 Harbour Group owns 200 businesses across 43 industries each valued at between $30-$500 million and totaling over $50 billion under management.

See also
 Sam Fox

References

External links
 Yahoo! business Profile
 Official website
 Current Company Portfolio

Companies based in St. Louis